Paul Booth is an American media scholar and a professor of Digital Communication and Media Arts at DePaul University in Chicago, Illinois. He serves on the editorial board of a number of journals, including Transformative Works and Cultures and the Journal of Fandom Studies. He also oversees the annual DePaul Pop Culture Conference.

Early life and education

Booth earned a bachelor's degree in English literature from the University of Illinois at Urbana–Champaign (where he performed in the improv comedy troupe Spicy Clamato), before earning a master's degree in communication from Northern Illinois University and a Ph.D. in rhetoric and communication from Rensselaer Polytechnic Institute.

Books

Authored

 Digital Fandom: New Media Studies (2010, Peter Lang Publishing)
 Time on TV: Temporal Displacement and Mashup Television (2012, Peter Lang Publishing)
 Playing Fans: Negotiating Fandom and Media in the Digital Age (2015, University of Iowa Press)
 Game Play: Paratextuality in Contemporary Board Games (2015, Bloomsbury Publishing)
 Digital Fandom 2.0: New Media Studies (2016, Peter Lang Publishing)
 Crossing Fandoms: SuperWhoLock and the Contemporary Fan Audience (2017, Palgrave)
 Poaching Politics: Online Communication During the 2016 Presidential Election (2018, Peter Lang Publishing), with Amber Davisson, Aaron Hess, and Ashley Hinck
 Watching Doctor Who: Fan Reception and Evaluation (2020, Bloomsbury Publishing), with Craig Owen Jones
 Board Games as Media (2021, Bloomsbury Publishing)

Edited or co-edited

 Fan Phenomena: Doctor Who (2013, Intellect Books)
 Controversies in Digital Ethics (2016, Bloomsbury Publishing), edited with Amber Davisson
 Seeing Fans: Representations of Fandom in Media and Popular Culture (2016, Bloomsbury), edited with Lucy Bennett
 Wiley Companion to Media Fandom and Fan Studies (2018, Blackwell Publishing)
 A Fan Studies Primer (2021, University of Iowa Press), edited with Rebecca Williams

References

American mass media scholars
DePaul University faculty
Video game researchers
Living people
Northern Illinois University alumni
Rensselaer Polytechnic Institute alumni
University of Illinois Urbana-Champaign alumni
Year of birth missing (living people)